The Swan 66 was a Sailing boat designed by German Frers built by Nautor's Swan and first launched in 2007.

References

External links
 Nautor Swan
 German Frers Official Website

Sailing yachts
Keelboats
2000s sailboat type designs
Sailboat types built by Nautor Swan
Sailboat type designs by Germán Frers